This Is Niecy is the debut album of American R&B singer Deniece Williams released on August 13, 1976 by Columbia Records. The album reached No. 3 on the Billboard Top Soul Albums chart and No. 33 on the Billboard 200. The album has been certified Gold in the US by the RIAA and Silver in the UK by the BPI.

Overview
The album was remastered and reissued with bonus tracks in 2013 by Big Break Records.

Critical reception

David O' Donnell of the BBC noted that "what really shines from the album is Williams' distinctive soprano voice, range and acrobatic vocal ability which confirms her as one of the greatest R&B and soul singers of her time." Sheila Prophet of Record Mirror gave the album a four out of five star rating. Calling This Is Niecy "a great first album", Prophet added "Niecy's voice combines the silkiness of Diana Ross with the exuberance of Linda Lewis".

Singles
Singles from the album were "Free" which reached No. 1 on the UK Singles Chart, No. 2 on the US Billboard Hot Soul Songs chart and No. 25 on the Billboard Hot 100.

Track listing

Personnel
 Deniece Williams – lead and backing vocals
 Maurice White – drums, backing vocals
 Freddie White – drums, percussion
 Verdine White – bass
 Al McKay – guitar
 Jerry Peters – acoustic piano, electric piano
 George Bohanon, Randy Aldcroft – trombone
 Gale Robinson, Sidney Muldrow – French Horn
 Oscar Brashear, Steve Madaio –  trumpet
 Ernie Watts, Plas Johnson, Ray Pizzi, Terry Harrington – woodwinds
 Sidney Barnes – backing vocals

Production
 Producers – Charles Stepney and Maurice White
 Engineer – George Massenburg
 Assistant Engineers – Steve Hodge and Dean Rod
 Mastered by Mike Reese at The Mastering Lab (Los Angeles, CA).
 Design – Ron Coro and Norm Ung
 Photography – Ethan Russell and Jimmy Shea
 Management – Cavallo-Ruffalo Management

Charts

Weekly charts

Year-end charts

Singles

References

External links 
 

1976 debut albums
Deniece Williams albums
Albums produced by Maurice White
Albums produced by Charles Stepney
Columbia Records albums